The 2019–20 season will be the 57th season of competitive association football in Algeria. on September 17, 2019 At the Extraordinary General Assembly of Algerian Football Federation It unanimously endorses the change of the competition system by increasing the number of clubs from 16 to 18, as for the second division to 32 clubs from two groups Central East and Central West from 16 clubs also became the number of professional clubs 18 instead of 32 starting from the season 2020–21. on September 30, at the monthly statutory meeting held in Ouargla. After debate and exchanges between the members, the Federal Office opted for the variant favoring the descent of two (02) clubs of the Ligue Professionnelle 1 and the rise of four (04) clubs of the League 2 to the upper tier.

Competitions

Promotion and relegation

Pre-season

National teams

Algeria national football team

Kits

International Friendlies

2021 Africa Cup of Nations qualification

Algerian women's national football team

League season

Ligue Professionnelle 1

Ligue Professionnelle 2

Ligue Nationale du Football Amateur

Group Est

Group Centre

Group West

Inter-Régions Division

Groupe Ouest

Groupe Centre Ouest

Groupe Centre Est

Groupe Est

Ligue Régional I

Ligue Régionale Ouargla

Managerial changes 
This is a list of changes of managers within Algerian league football:

Women's football

Retirements 
 30 June 2019: Moustapha Djallit, 35, former Algeria, WA Tlemcen, ES Sétif, JSM Béjaïa, MC Alger and JS Saoura striker.

Notes

References